Renée Saint-Cyr (16 November 1904 – 11 July 2004) was a French actress. She appeared in more than 60 films between 1933 and 1994. She was the mother of Georges Lautner, who also achieved fame in the film business, albeit as a director.

Selected filmography

 The Two Orphans (1933) - Henriette
 Toto (1933) - Ginette
 D'amour et d'eau fraîche (1933) - Colette
 Incognito (1934)
 Une fois dans la vie (1934) - Lili
 Arlette et ses papas (1934) - Arlette
 The Last Billionaire (1934) - Princess Isabelle
 Le billet de mille (1935) - Gisèle, la vendeuse
 School for Coquettes (1935) - Ginette
 Royal Waltz (1936) - Thérèse Tomasoni
 Les pattes de mouche (1936) - Suzanne
 Valse éternelle (1936) - Marie-Claire
 Donogoo Tonka (1936) - Josette
 Les loups entre eux (1936) - Nicole Servigne
 27 Rue de la Paix (1936) - Gloria Grand
 Paris (1937) - Jeanne 'Biche' Lafortune
 Trois... six... neuf (1937) - Agnès
 The Pearls of the Crown (1937) - Madeleine de la Tour d'Auvergne
 Le coeur dispose (1937) - Hélène
 Strange Boarders (1938) - Louise Blythe
 Women's Prison (1938) - Juliette Régent
 Night in December (1940) - Anne Morris / Helen Morris
 Le chemin de l'honneur (1940) - Renée de Marvilliers
 Red Roses (1940) - Maria Verani
 La Symphonie fantastique (1942) - Marie Martin
 The Lost Woman (1942) - Marie Vidal
 Madame et le mort (1943) - Clarisse Coquet
 Marie-Martine (1943) - Marie-Martine
 Retour de flamme (1943) - Edwige
 Pierre and Jean (1943) - Alice Roland
 Pamela (1945) - Paméla
 Strange Fate (1946) - Patricia
 L'insaisissable Frédéric (1946) - Solange Delmont
 The Beautiful Trip (1947) - Lena
 Tous les deux (1949) - Claude Chaussaigne
 La voix du rêve (1949) - Eve
 Fusillé à l'aube (1950) - Florence Hennings
 Captain Ardant (1951) - Maria del Fuego
 Le Chevalier de la nuit (1953) - Bella Fontanges
 Le Chevalier de Maison-Rouge (1954) - Marie-Antoinette
 The Blue Danube (1955) - Susanne
 If Paris Were Told to Us (1956) - L'Impératrice Eugènie
 Coctail party (1960) - Lavinia Chamberlayne
 La Fayette (1962) - Duchesse d'Ayen
 The Monocle Laughs (1964) - Madame Hui
 Déclic et des claques (1965) - La mère de Ferdinand
 Fleur d'oseille (1967) - La Directrice
 Jeunes filles bien... pour tous rapports (1968) - Frau Tissot
 Dieu a choisi Paris (1969)
 Quelques messieurs trop tranquilles (1973) - Countess
 O.K. patron (1974) - Yvette Hutin, la mère de Sophie
 Vous intéressez-vous à la chose? (1974) - La grand-mère
 Pas de problème! (1975) - Docteur Laville
 Now We've Seen It All! (1976) - Mme Ferroni
 Ils sont fous ces sorciers (1978) - Marie-Louise Précy-Lamont
 Est-ce bien raisonnable? (1981) - La veuve Bertillon
 Attention une femme peut en cacher une autre! (1983) - Mme Le Boucau / Mrs. Le Boucau
 Le cowboy (1985) - Marie-Louise, la mère de César
 L'invité surprise (1989) - Léa
 Room Service (1992) - La comtesse
 Sup de fric (1992) - Madame de Valmy

References

External links

 

1904 births
2004 deaths
People from Beausoleil, Alpes-Maritimes
French film actresses
20th-century French actresses